Fatih Mimar Sinan Stadium is a football stadium in the Fatih district of Istanbul, Turkey. It is named after the Ottoman chief architect Mimar Sinan (c. 1488/1490–1588).

The stadium is situated at Keçeci Meydanı Street in Karagümrük neighborhood of Fatih. Built in 2011, the venue is owned and operated by the Municipality of Fatih. The stadium has a capacity of 1,250 spectators including 20 seats for the press and 60 seats for VIP. The ground is covered by artificial turf, and it is equipped with floodlights for illumination.

The stadium is used mainly for football matches, and it is the home ground of some of the 42 amateur football clubs in the district, as well as of Fatih Vatan Spor women's football team. The venue and the Youth and Sports Center annexed also are allocated to events organized by the municipality, including summer sports schools, physical education and training of nearby schools, the annual "1453 Conquest Cup for Chess" and the traditional "Africa Football Cup and Festival" event held annually, at which citizens of more than 15 African countries living in the district take part.

References

Football venues in Turkey
Sports venues in Istanbul
Buildings and structures in Istanbul
Sports venues completed in 2011
Fatih
2011 establishments in Turkey